

The Albatros L 68 Alauda was a two-seat German trainer aircraft of the 1920s. It was a single-engine biplane of conventional configuration that seated the pilot and instructor in tandem, open cockpits. The wings were of unequal span and had a pronounced stagger.

Variants
 L 68 - original production version with Siemens-Halske Sh 11 engine (3 built)
 L 68a - longer wingspan and Sh 12 engine (3 built)
 L 68c - main production version based on L 68a (10 built)
 L 68d - Siemens-Halske Sh.III engine (1 built)
 L 68e - Armstrong Siddeley Lynx engine (1 built)

Specifications (L 68c)

See also

References

 
 German Aircraft between 1919–1945

Biplanes
Single-engined tractor aircraft
1920s German civil trainer aircraft
L 068